A statue of politician, diplomat, and orator Edward Everett by William Wetmore Story is installed in Boston's Richardson Park, in the U.S. state of Massachusetts.

Description
The bronze sculpture measures approximately 7 x 4 x 2.5 ft. and rests on a granite base that measures approximately 7 x 5.5 x 5.5 ft.

History
The statue was modeled in 1866, cast the following year, and installed in Boston Public Garden on November 18, 1867. It was relocated to Edward Everett Square in 1911. In 1931, the work was placed in storage for four years before being installed in Richardson Park in 1935.

The memorial was surveyed by the Smithsonian Institution’s "Save Outdoor Sculpture!" program in 1993.

References

External links
 

1867 establishments in Massachusetts
1867 sculptures
Boston Public Garden
Bronze sculptures in Massachusetts
Granite sculptures in Massachusetts
Monuments and memorials in Boston
Outdoor sculptures in Boston
Sculptures of men in Massachusetts
Statues in Boston